Kheira Bouziane-Laroussi (born 23 August 1953) is a French politician, elected in 2012 (as Kheira Bouziane) as a deputy for the Socialist Party.

In 2008 she became alderman for solidarity and family in Quetigny, a town in Côte-d'Or. She was chosen as the Socialist Party candidate for the 2012 French legislative election in the Côte-d'Or's 3rd constituency, already held by a female Socialist MP since 2002. It was a constituency reserved for a woman candidate, and all three candidates at the internal Socialist primaries had non European roots, Kheira Bouziane and Fadila Khattabi from Algeria and Safia Otokoré from Somalia. She was finally selected. She had been a leading local member of the support committee for Martine Aubry for the French presidential primaries to select the Socialist Party candidate in 2011. She finished first in the first round, with 37.98%, and won the second round with 53.05%.

She stood in the 2017 election for Côte-d'Or's 3rd constituency as a Miscellaneous left candidate, and did not make the second round, which was won by LREM's Fadila Khattabi.

Notes and references

1953 births
Living people
People from Oran
French people of Algerian descent
Socialist Party (France) politicians
Women members of the National Assembly (France)
Deputies of the 14th National Assembly of the French Fifth Republic
21st-century French women politicians